Kuljić is a South Slavic surname. Notable people with the surname include:

 Sanel Kuljić (born 1977), Austrian footballer of Bosnian descent
 Zdravko Kuljić (born 1953), Yugoslav volleyball player

Serbian surnames